Ike, also known as Ike: The War Years, is a 1979 television miniseries about the life of Dwight D. Eisenhower, mostly focusing on his time as Supreme Commander in Europe during World War II. The screenplay, written by Melville Shavelson, was based on Kay Summersby's 1948 memoir Eisenhower Was My Boss and her 1975 autobiography, Past Forgetting: My Love Affair.

Directed by Boris Sagal and Melville Shavelson, the production starred Robert Duvall as Eisenhower and Lee Remick as Kay Summersby. Film editors John Woodcock and Bill Lenny won an Eddie Award for their work and the series garnered five Emmy Award nominations.

Cast 

 Vernon Dobtcheff: Gen. Charles DeGaulle
 Robert Duvall: Gen. Dwight D. Eisenhower
 Terence Alexander: Gen. Arthur Tedder
 Dana Andrews: Gen. George C. Marshall
 Bonnie Bartlett: Mamie Eisenhower
 Whit Bissell: Admiral
 William Boyett: Gen. Ward Hoffenberg
 K. Callan: Mrs Westerfield
 J.D. Cannon: Gen. Walter Bedell Smith
 David de Keyser: Field Marshall Sir Alan Brooke
 Lee Remick: Kay Summersby

External links

1970s American television miniseries
Television series produced at Pinewood Studios
Television series set in the 1940s
American World War II films
Cultural depictions of Dwight D. Eisenhower
Cultural depictions of Franklin D. Roosevelt
Cultural depictions of George S. Patton
Cultural depictions of Charles de Gaulle
Cultural depictions of Winston Churchill
Films directed by Boris Sagal